Govindhampalayam  is a village in Karur district in the Indian state of Tamil Nadu situated on the banks of Cauvery.

Villages in Karur district